Masolo United Football Club (simply known as Masolo United) is an Indonesian football club based in Pinrang Regency, South Sulawesi. They currently compete in the Liga 3.

Honours
 Liga 3 South Sulawesi
 Third-place: 2021

References

External links
 Masolo United FC Instagram

Football clubs in Indonesia
Football clubs in South Sulawesi
Association football clubs established in 2020
2020 establishments in Indonesia